Than Tun is a common Burmese name, and may refer to:

 Thakin Than Tun (1911-1968): Burmese politician and leader of Communist Party of Burma
 Than Tun (1923-2005): Burmese historian, leading authority in the history of Pagan Dynasty, winner of Fukuoka Asian Culture Prize
 Salai Than Tun (1928-): Burmese academic and political dissident.
 Than Tun (boxer) (b. 1941), Burmese boxer